Vladimir Vuletić (born 28 November 1978) is a Serbian lawyer, associate professor at the Faculty of Law, University of Belgrade and a former vice president of FK Partizan.

Early life and education 
He was born on 28 November 1978 in Šabac, at that time part of SR Serbia and SFR Yugoslavia. There he finished the elementary school "Janko Veselinović" and then the Šabac Gymnasium.

He enrolled at the Faculty of Law, University of Belgrade in 1997. He graduated in June 2001 as a student of the generation. He was a scholarship holder of the Government of the Republic of Serbia and the Embassy of the Kingdom of Norway in Belgrade.

He attended postgraduate studies at the Faculty of Law, University of Belgrade. He defended his master's thesis "Seller's Liability for Physical Defects in Classical Roman Law" in November 2006, and his doctoral thesis "Protection of the Buyer's Rights - the Contribution of Roman Classical Law to the Development of European Private Law" in June 2010.

Academic career 
He was elected an assistant-trainee at the Faculty of Law of the University of Belgrade in the field of Roman law in March 2003. He became an assistant in June 2007.

He was elected assistant professor in March 2011. He was the Secretary of the Department of Legal History from 2003 to 2008.

He is currently an associate professor at the Faculty of Law, University of Belgrade.

FK Partizan 
At the annual assembly of FK Partizan, in December 2014, he was elected president of the club's Supervisory Board.

Vuletic served as the vice president of FK Partizan until his resignation on 9 February 2021 after the arrest of the members of the FK Partizan supporters group Grobari, and the discovery of hidden bunkers on the Partizan Stadium which were used for criminal activities.

Political career 
On 24 May 2021, Vuletić said that he will run for President of Serbia at the 2022 Serbian presidential election. On 1 June 2021, Vuletić founded a new political organization called Black on White, which, as he said, will fight for a "legal and just state" and against the SNS-led government.

Acting career 
In two episodes of the first season of the series Balkan Shadows by Dragan Bjelogrlić, which was broadcast at the end of 2017 on RTS1, Vuletić appeared in the role of a member of the Thule Society.

References 

1978 births
Living people
People from Šabac
21st-century Serbian lawyers
University of Belgrade Faculty of Law alumni
Academic staff of the University of Belgrade
FK Partizan non-playing staff